The 2010–11 The Citadel Bulldogs basketball team represented The Citadel, The Military College of South Carolina in the 2010-11 NCAA Division I men's basketball season. The Bulldogs were led by first year head coach Chuck Driesell and played their home games at McAlister Field House. They played as members of the Southern Conference, as they have since 1936.

Schedule
 
|-
! colspan=8 style=|Regular Season

|-
! colspan=8 style=|

References

The Citadel Bulldogs basketball seasons
Citadel
Citadel
Citadel